Charles Street is a major road in the inner northern suburbs of Perth, Western Australia. It runs from Newcastle Street and extends up to London Street, providing a connection between Mitchell Freeway and Wanneroo Road. It is the southern section of  part of State Route 60, which continues north along Wanneroo Road.

History
The street was named after Captain Charles Fitzgerald, Governor of WA, 1848–55. The section of Charles Street from Carr Street to Walcott Street was originally an extension of Wanneroo Road. Its name appears for the first time on maps of the Land Department in 1853.

In October 2022, Main Roads began a planning study to upgrade Charles Street with grade-separated "duck and dive" interchanges (effectively single-point diamond or roundabout interchanges in which the intersection is at-grade and the free-flowing road is below ground) at its busy Vincent Street, Scarborough Beach Road, and Walcott Street intersections. However, after community opposition to the required demolition of about 100 properties, the study was abandoned in November 2022.

References

Streets in Perth central business district, Western Australia
Roads in Perth, Western Australia